"This Time/I Wish You Well" is the second single release from After the Morning, the third album by Cara Dillon. "This Time" was remixed with additional vocals, electric guitar and percussion for the single. The release date of the double A-side single was originally 31 July 2006, to coincide with Cambridge Folk Festival (which Dillon was to perform at), but was changed to 14 August 2006. The radio mix of "This Time" later became available on the Irish compilation album Tuesday's Child as well.

Personnel
Cara Dillon - vocals
Sam Lakeman – piano, guitar, accordion, percussion, producer
Simon Lea – drums
Ben Nicholls –  bass guitar, banjo, upright bass
Neil MacColl – acoustic and electric guitar, mandolin
Roy Dodds - percussion

2006 singles
2006 songs
Rough Trade Records singles